Donna Allard is a Canadian poet and writer. From 2000 to 2011, she served as Atlantic representative, national coordinator and president of the Canadian Poetry Association and was on its board of directors. She was president of the executive board of the Canadian Poetry Association from 2005-2011, and is a founder of the Sojourner Literary Festival and co-founder of the Canadian Poets Guild (2016). She was also a founder of the National Milton Acorn Festival, where she served for eight years. She was named National Beat Poet Laureate in 2020. She lives in Richibucto, New Brunswick.

Early life
Allard is from the fishing village of Richibucto, New Brunswick. Her first published poem was "Friends", which she wrote in 1972 for the FHS Yearbook. Her first poetry performance was in 1988 at the National Milton Acorn Festival. She has performed with poets including bill bissett, John B. Lee, Robert Priest, Nicole Brossard, Joseph Sherman, Fred Stenson and Rita Joe.

Published works
1998:Postal Code I
2001:No Love Lost II
2001:Poetea For Six
2002:Oral Victory
2002:Time of Trial: Beyond the Terror of 9/11
2003:Handprints For The Future
2006:Bellwalker
2006:Hand Upon the Dunes
2006:Minago Streets
2012:From Shore To Shoormal
2019:Three Times Around the World, Coldfire, Ghost in the Window

See also

Canadian literature
Canadian poetry
List of Canadian poets
List of Canadian writers

References

External links
, Author Donna Allard International Beat Poet Laureate Official Website

20th-century Canadian poets
21st-century Canadian poets
Canadian women poets
Living people
20th-century Canadian women writers
21st-century Canadian women writers
Year of birth missing (living people)